Kovilpatti is an Industrial City and Special Grade Municipality in Thoothukudi District in the Indian state of Tamil Nadu.

History 
The town already existed before 1876. Kovilpatti was a water stop for steam engines after the introduction of the Southern Railways, and the establishment of textile mills like Loyal Textiles (1891) and Lakshmi Mills Ltd (1926) fueled the economic growth of the town. The Government Revenue divisional offices were sited there in 1911. The town was constituted as a Municipal Town in 1964 composed of Kovilpatti Village and Illuppaiyurani village.

Geography 

It has an average elevation of 106 metres (347 feet). Located 100 km south of Madurai, 55 km north of Tirunelveli and 60 km north-west of Tuticorin, Kovilpatti is situated on National Highway No. 07 NH 7, which connects Srinagar in the north and Kanyakumari in the south. The town lies approximately 130 m above mean sea level.

Climate 
The climate of Kovilpatti town is hot and dry. Temperatures range between a maximum of 37 °C and a minimum of 22 °C. April to June are the hottest months and December and January are coldest with temperatures rising towards the end of February. Rainfall occurs mostly during the north-east monsoon in the months of October to December. However, the town receives little rainfall, averaging 840 mm compared to the district average. Annual rainfall has ranged from 964 mm to 228 mm during past decades.

Demographics

Population 
In 1961, the area of the town was 2.64 km2 with a population of 33,305; in 1971, it extended to 7.25 km2 and the population reached 48,509. In 1991, it was 12.58 km2 with a population of 78,834.

In the 2011 census, Kovilpatti had a population of 95,057. The sex-ratio of 1,065 females to 1,000 males much exceeded the national average of 929. A total of 8,325 residents were under the age of six, constituting 4,158 males and 4,167 females. Scheduled Castes and Scheduled Tribes accounted for 10.32% and 0.84% of the population respectively. The literacy rate of the city was 81.27%, compared to the national average of 72.99%. The city had a total of 25099 households in 2011. There were a total of 41,006 workers, comprising 85 cultivators, 165 main agricultural labourers, 932 in household industries, 36,989 other workers, 2,835 marginal workers, 26 marginal cultivators, 26 marginal agricultural labourers, 262 marginal workers in household industries and 2,521 other marginal workers.

Religion 

 
In the religious census of 2011, Kovilpatti was 92.29% Hindus, 2.48% Muslims, 5.12% Christians, 0.01% Sikhs, 0.01% Buddhists and 0.08% followers of other religions.

Government and politics 
Kovilpatti (state assembly constituency) is part of the Thoothukkudi (Lok Sabha constituency).

The member of loksabha currently is Kanimozhi from DMK party and the state legislative member is Kadambur Raju from All India Anna Dravida Munnetra Kazhagam party.

Economy 
Kovilpatti is one of the industrial cities in Tamil Nadu with almost all the Nationalized and Private banks having branches. The town started its industrial development earlier than 1891. The introduction of the Southern Railway, the establishment of Loyal Textiles (1891), Lakshmi Mills (1926),  establishment of Government Revenue Divisional Offices (1911), induced the industrial growth of the town. Kovilpatti is famous for match factories, like rose matches, cycle brand, eagle box. textile mills and fireworks industry. Kovilpatti and its neighboring towns are candy paradise and most shops sell eatables like dark brown spiral candy, bright yellow wavy sev, Ellu mittai, cocoa mittai, cheeni mittai, karupatti mittai and yeni padi mittai.

Kovilpatti is the leading producer of matches in the country and hence gets the name "Matchless city of Matches". It stands second in the firework industry in the country just after Sivakasi. Kovilpatti is famous for its unique candy kadalai mittai (Ground-nut candy) and is referred to as "Land of Homemade sweets and Savouries" . Manthithoppu Transgenders' Milk Producers' Cooperative Society (MTMPCS) - The first cooperative society in the country to be run by trans people was set up at Manthithoppu in Kovilpatti by the former Thoothukudi district Collector Mr.Sandeep Nanduri IAS.

Culture/Cityscape

Landmarks 
Points of interest are the ruins of Ettayapuram Jamin palace, the Manimandapam of Bharathiyar, the birth house of Bharathiyar, and the memorial of Sri Muthusamy Deikshidar.

Kalugumalai is a massive dome of rock of  height situated on the road connecting Kovilpatti and Sankarankoil, westerly. It is famous for a rock cut temple called "Vettuvankoil" and these arts also proudly called as "Southern Ellora". Another rock cut temple is dedicated to lord Subramaniya Swamy is located at the foot of the rock. The remains of "Samana Palli" or Jain school can be seen atop the hill along the Vettuvan Koil. The government of Tamil Nadu has listed this place as tourist place.

Sankarankoil is situated west of Kovilpatti. It is the site of temple of Sankara Narayanar and Gomathiamman and attracts pilgrims and devotees from the surrounding districts. The Adithapasu festival attracts large crowds every year during July or August.

Festivals 
The Chithirai festival of the Shenbagavalli Poovananathar temple is celebrated annually in mid-April marking the start of Tamil New Year. Ugadhi is celebrated among Telugu speaking people.

Cuisine 

"Kadalai mittai" i.e. (Peanut candy/Chikki) is the signature dish of the town. It attracts people from all part of the world. Large quantities get exported to Southeast Asia, Europe and the US.It has got GI(Geographical Indication) tag from GOI in 2020

Similarly Kaisuthu muruku, Karuppatti Mithai and Karasevu are also notable food in the Kovilpatti region.
Asiacandy is popular and famous for peanutcandy.

Transport

By Air 
St. Bobgalie's Airport a small, unused airport which is rarely used as a helipad.

By Rail 
Kovilpatti Railway Station has three platforms with stoppings for all Major Express and passenger trains. In view of the doubling of tracks between Madurai and Thoothukudi/Nagercoil, the Railway station

By Road 
Kovilpatti is connected by Road number NH 44.  It has two bus stations, Arignar Anna bus stand & the new bus stand. Anna bus stand is within the town, new bus stand is in highway number NH 44.

Education

Polytechnic
 Lakshmi Ammal polytechnic college

Engineering Colleges
 National Engineering College
 Unnamalai Institute of Technology

Arts and Science Colleges
 Unnamalai Arts and Science college
 G. Venkataswamy Naidu College of Arts and Science(Autonomous)
 K.R. College of Arts and Science
 S.S. Duraisamy Nadar Mariammal College
 Punitha Ohm College of Education
 Govt Arts & Science College

Others

Oscar Institute Of Science And Management

Annai Theresa Paramedical College

Stadium
SDAT Astroturf Hockey Stadium
International Field Hockey Stadium- Kovilpatti 628501

Research Centre
Kovilpatti Veterinary Research Centre
Government of Tamil Nadu,
Department of Animal Care
Veterinary Hospital,
Kovilpatti-628501

References

External links
Homepage of Kovilpatti Municipality
Thoothukudi District Official Webpage

Cities and towns in Thoothukudi district